Olivier Veigneau (born 16 July 1985) is a French professional footballer who plays as a left-back.

References

External links
 
 

1985 births
Living people
Sportspeople from Suresnes
French footballers
France youth international footballers
France under-21 international footballers
French expatriate footballers
Ligue 1 players
Ligue 2 players
2. Bundesliga players
Süper Lig players
AS Monaco FC players
OGC Nice players
MSV Duisburg players
FC Nantes players
Kasımpaşa S.K. footballers
Expatriate footballers in Germany
Expatriate footballers in Turkey
Association football fullbacks
Footballers from Hauts-de-Seine